Internet Download Manager (also called IDM) is a shareware download manager software application owned by American company Tonec, Inc. It is only available for the Microsoft Windows operating system.

IDM is a tool that manages and schedules downloads. It can use full bandwidth, and contains recovery and resume capabilities to continue downloading files that were interrupted due to a loss of network connection or other unexpected failures.

IDM supports a wide range of proxy servers such as firewall, FTP, and HTTP protocols,  cookies, MP3 audio and MPEG video processing. It is compatible with Google Chrome, Mozilla Firefox, Microsoft Edge, Opera and other popular browsers to manage downloads from the internet.

Features 
 Divides downloads into multiple streams for faster downloading.
 Batch downloads.
 Import/Export download jobs.
 Auto/manual updating of download address.
 Multiple queues.
 Recent downloads list for easy access to directories.
 Video downloading from streaming video sites
 Dynamic segmentation throughout the downloading process
 Protocols: HTTP, FTP, HTTPS, MMS and Microsoft ISA
 Authentication protocols: Basic, NTLM, and Kerberos allowing for storage and auto-authentication of user names and passwords
 Support for the following web browsers: Google Chrome, Microsoft Edge, Apple Safari, Firefox, Opera and many others

Reception 
In CNET, IDM received a user rating of 4 out of 5 stars, based on 1,909 votes.

Softpedia gave IDM a rating of 5 out of 5 stars, complementing on its convenience, effectiveness & diversity of options. An extended review has been done by Softpedia in March 2014; giving the software 4 out of 5 stars, but criticized IDM for not having released a major version since 2010. An updated review gave IDM a rating of 5 out of 5 stars again.

References

External links 
 

Download managers
Windows-only shareware
C++ software
Proprietary software